Ksenia Ivanovna Zadorina (born March 2, 1987) is a Russian sprinter.

International competitions

References

 

1987 births
Living people
People from Kotlas
Sportspeople from Arkhangelsk Oblast
Russian female sprinters
Universiade medalists in athletics (track and field)
Universiade silver medalists for Russia
Universiade bronze medalists for Russia
Medalists at the 2007 Summer Universiade
World Athletics Championships athletes for Russia
European Athletics Championships medalists
Russian Athletics Championships winners